Ultrasonic were a Scottish electronic music band.

Discography

Studio albums

Live albums
Live at Club Kinetic (1996)

Charting singles

References

British techno music groups
Scottish electronic music groups